is a Japanese volleyball player who plays for Baki-Azeryol.

Profiles
She became a volleyball player at 10 years old.
Her nickname "Sei" was derived from the name of her former high school.
Her new nickname, "Noah", is derived from her name: "iNO Akiko"

Clubs
Seiei High School →  Hitachi Sawa Rivale (2005–2007) →  RC Cannes (2007–2009) →  NEC Red Rockets (2009-2012) →  Baki-Azeryol (2012-)

National team
2005  Junior National team
2006  World Grand Prix

Awards

Individuals
2006 12th V.League (Japan) Servereceive award
2007 2006-07 Women's V.Premier League Servereceive award

Team
2011 60th Kurowashiki All Japan Volleyball Tournament -  Runner-up, with NEC Red Rockets.

National team
2010 World Championship - Bronze medal

References

External links
  Akiko INO biography at FIVB
 Ino Akiko official website
  NEC announced her joining  
 Members of Baku

Living people
1986 births
People from Edogawa, Tokyo
Asian Games medalists in volleyball
Volleyball players at the 2006 Asian Games
Japanese women's volleyball players
Medalists at the 2006 Asian Games
Asian Games silver medalists for Japan